The Turkish Data Protection Authority (KVKK) is a government organization in Turkey which provides the protection of personal data and works to develop awareness in this respect in the public eye in line with the fundamental rights related with privacy and freedom stated in the Constitution. Turkish Data Protection Authority was established under the Law on the Protection of Personal Data No. 6698 published in 2016.

References

External links
The Turkish Data Protection Authority – Official website (In English)

Government agencies of Turkey
2017 establishments in Turkey
Organizations based in Ankara
Regulatory and supervisory agencies of Turkey
Data protection authorities